The Horace Walker House, also known as Castillo Sebastian is a historic home in St. Augustine, Florida built around 1888. It is located at 33 Old Mission Avenue, near the north city gate. On January 30, 1998, it was added to the U.S. National Register of Historic Places.

The house was erected using mold-formed concrete blocks, commonly called "artificial stone".  Smith was the first to make concrete blocks that used crushed coquina instead of sand, along with Portland cement. In the late 19th century, this type of construction was new but the blocks used display the same characteristics: smooth/rough opposite surfaces, plus iron rods used for structural reinforcement.

The two-story, two bedroom, two bath house is one of St. Augustine's smallest examples of Moorish Revival architecture. The flat roof with decorative parapets are typical for the style; as is the front porch with five Tuscan arches—three facing the street. The interior is ornate, with heart of pine floors; the doors and ceilings feature carved wood. The central element is a double staircase with a landing between.

The structure was designed by Franklin W. Smith, who also constructed Villa Zorayda, his personal residence in St. Augustine, and the Casa Monica Hotel, which was sold to Henry Flagler.

References

External links
 St. Johns County listings at National Register of Historic Places
 Florida's Office of Cultural and Historical Programs
 St. Johns County listings at Florida's Office of Cultural and Historical Programs
 Walker House

Houses on the National Register of Historic Places in Florida
National Register of Historic Places in St. Johns County, Florida
Buildings and structures in St. Augustine, Florida
Moorish Revival architecture in Florida
Houses completed in 1888
Houses in St. Johns County, Florida
Vernacular architecture in Florida